Hořice is a municipality and village in Pelhřimov District in the Vysočina Region of the Czech Republic. It has about 200 inhabitants.

Administrative parts
Villages of Děkančice and Hroznětice are administrative parts of Hořice.

Gallery

References

Villages in Pelhřimov District